YAF may stand for:

 Young Americans for Freedom
 Young America's Foundation
 Young Artists Forum, Palestine
 You Are Free, an album by American singer/songwriter Cat Power

yaf is the ISO 630 code for Yaka language (Congo–Angola).